Trihydroxyflavanone may refer to:

 Butin (molecule)  (3',4',7-trihydroxyflavanone)
 Garbanzol (3,7,4'-trihydroxyflavanone)
 Naringenin (4',5,7-trihydroxyflavanone)
 Pinobanksin (3,5,7-trihydroxyflavanone)